Oxley was a Legislative Assembly electorate in the state of Queensland.

History
This one-member electorate was created in the redistribution of 1872 (taking effect at the 1873 elections) from the electoral district of East Moreton. It covered from Toowong to Enoggera to Goodna, including Yeronga and Kurilpa.

In 1888, the part north of the Brisbane River was separated into the electoral district of Toowong, while Oxley extended south to Browns Plains and Woodridge.

Oxley was abolished in the redistribution 1949 (taking effect at the 1950 elections) by dividing it into Sherwood, Yeronga  and electoral district of Mount Gravatt.

Members

The following people represented this electorate:

 = by-election
 = died in office

See also
 Electoral districts of Queensland
 Members of the Queensland Legislative Assembly by year
 :Category:Members of the Queensland Legislative Assembly by name

References

Former electoral districts of Queensland
1873 establishments in Australia
1950 disestablishments in Australia
Constituencies established in 1873
Constituencies disestablished in 1950
Oxley, Queensland